Chandrasena Munaweera (9 July 1926 - 19??) was a Sri Lankan politician. He was the member of Parliament of Sri Lanka from Rattota representing the Sri Lanka Freedom Party. 

He was elected to parliament from Rattota in the March 1960 general election and was re-elected in the July 1960 general election defeating V. T. Nanayakkara. He crossed over to the opposition with C. P. de Silva in December 1964. He lost is seat in the 1965 general election to S. B. Yalegama of the Sri Lanka Freedom Party when he contested from the Sri Lanka Freedom Socialist Party and was defeated by Yalegama in the 1970 general election, when he contested from the United National Party.

References

1926 births

Members of the 4th Parliament of Ceylon
Members of the 5th Parliament of Ceylon
Sri Lanka Freedom Party politicians
United National Party politicians